Call signs in Oceania are currently voluntary in Australia radio and TV station, and were previously compulsory in New Zealand. In both countries, stations like 2GB and Newstalk ZB continue to use parts of the call signs in their branding.

The International Telecommunication Union has assigned countries in the Oceania the following call sign blocks for all radio communication, broadcasting or transmission:

History

The conference held in 1927 assigned call prefixes mainly to colonial powers.  The only modern Oceanic nation mentioned was an Anglo-French condominium lasting from 1906 until 1980, when the New Hebrides gained their independence as Vanuatu.  New Hebrides was assigned YHA–YHZ.

The 1947 Atlantic City ITU Conference reallocated call sign blocks some developing island nations.  This time New Hebrides was assigned YJA–YJZ.  All other islands were assigned call prefixes according to their colonial or protectorate status.

Since 1947 and the various independence movements, new call signs were assigned by the ITU or a new host country.  This is particularly true of Japanese territories occupied by the United States following WWII.

Melanesia

Micronesia

Polynesia

While not directly related to call signs, the International Telecommunication Union (ITU) further has divided all countries assigned amateur radio prefixes into three regions; countries and territories in Oceania are located in ITU Region 3.  They cover CQ Zones 27, 28, 31, 32 and 12.

Deleted or changed entities

These are the deleted or changed DXCC entities in Oceania since World War II:

Amateur radio call signs

Amateur radio or ham radio call signs are unique identifiers for more than 2,500 licensed operators in the western Pacific.  Call signs are regulated internationally by the ITU as well as nationally by island national entities, some of which are independent countries and others are under colonial administration.  For the purposes of this article, Australia, its dependencies and New Zealand are excluded.  Also not included are Oceanic Indonesian areas of Irian Jaya and the Maluku Islands.

Since call sign allocation from the International Telegraph Union is administered by national political authorities and international mandates, it is a story of colonial transition within the 20th Century.

References

External links
 AC6V call sign history page
 International Telecommunication Union country call sign assignments
 CQ Zone map

Oceania
Communications in Oceania